Danny Lee may refer to:

Arts and entertainment
Danny Lee (actor) (born 1952), Hong Kong actor, film producer, writer and director
Danny Lee (filmmaker) (born 1978), American film director, writer and editor
Danny Lee (special effects artist) (1919–2014), Academy Award-winning visual effects artist

Sports
Danny Lee (boxer) (born 1940), Scottish boxer
Danny Lee (rugby league) (born 1965), Australian rugby league footballer
Danny Lee (rugby union) (born 1976), New Zealand rugby union footballer
Danny Lee (golfer) (born 1990), Korean-New Zealand golfer

See also
Daniel Lee (disambiguation)
Danni Leigh (born 1970), American country music singer
Danny Le or Shiphtur (born 1993), Canadian League of Legends player